Bajwa Khurd is a village in Shahkot in Jalandhar district of Punjab State, India. "Kalan" is Persian language word which means "big" and "Khurd" is Persian word which means "small". When two villages have same name then they are distinguished with Kalan for "Big" and Khurd for "Small" used with village name.

The village is administrated by a sarpanch who is an elected representative of village as per Panchayati raj (India).

The sarpanch of the village is Kala Sarpanch

To educate people there is an elementary school. 

A fair at Gurdwara Sahib of Bajwa Khurs is celebrated by the villages of Aidalpur and Bajwa Khurd on 26 and 27 May.

Transport 
Shahkot Malisian station is the nearest train station.

References 

Villages in Jalandhar district